Kasper Niesiecki (31 December 1682 – 9 July 1744), also known as Kacper Niesiecki, was a Polish heraldist, Jesuit, lexicographer, writer, theologian and preacher.

Biography
 
Niesiecki was born in Greater Poland to a burgher family. In 1699 he began training as a Jesuit in Kraków. From 1701 to 1704 he studied philosophy in Lublin, earning a master's degree. In 1707 Niesiecki started his studies in theology at the Jagiellonian University, graduating in 1711. He undertook further study in Lutsk, Krosno, Bydgoszcz, Chojnice and Kalisz.

Between 1715 and 1723 Niesiecki worked as a preacher in Masovia, Greater Poland, Lesser Poland and Ruthenia. He taught rhetoric in Bydgoszcz and Chojnice, and ethics and mathematics in Kalisz. From 1724 he lived in the monastery of Krasnystaw, where he engaged in his life's work, compiling the Herbarz Polski (Polish Armorial). Niesiecki died there on 9 July 1744.

The first volume of Herbarz Polski was published in 1728 in Lwów. Niesiecki wanted to write it in Latin, but his patron, Marianna from Potocki-Tarłowa, specified that it was to be published in Polish. Because Niesiecki tried to not use unverified sources and legends, he was opposed by the szlachta (Polish nobility). He continued with the work; however, there were delays in printing the next volumes. After the fourth volume was published attacks by the nobles increased; they sent letters of protest to his Polish and Roman superiors. Work on the fifth volume was interrupted by his death; it was completed by Stanisław Czapliński, but never published. In the opinion of historians, the work of Niesiecki obeys all world-standards of genealogy.

In the 19th century the armorial was expanded by several authors and published by Jan Nepomucen de Bobrowicz in Leipzig.

Polish Armorial

 Herbarz Polski (Polish Armorial) full title: "Korona Polska przy złotey wolnosci starożytnemi Rycerstwa Polskiego y Wielkiego Xięstwa Litewskiego kleynotami naywyższymi Honorami Heroicznym, Męstwem y odwagą, Wytworną Nauką a naypierwey Cnotą, nauką Pobożnością, y Swiątobliwością ozdobiona Potomnym zaś wiekom na zaszczyt y nieśmiertelną sławę Pamiętnych w tey Oyczyźnie Synow podana TOM ... Przez X. Kaspra Niesieckego Societatis Jesu", Lviv, 1738.
"Korona Polska..." vol. 1
"Korona Polska..." vol. 2
"Korona Polska..." vol. 3
"Korona Polska..." vol. 4
edition expanded by other authors: Herbarz Polski... vol. 4-10, published by Jan Nepomucen de Bobrowicz, Leipzig, 1841
Herbarz Polski... - some volumes

See also
Polish literature
Polish heraldry

References

 Coats of arms pictures from Herbarz Polski

18th-century Polish Jesuits
Polish male writers
Polish genealogists
1682 births
1744 deaths
Polish heraldists
Polish lexicographers
18th-century lexicographers